Paul Dodd (born 10 September 1937) is  a former Australian rules footballer who played with St Kilda in the Victorian Football League (VFL).  Injuries ended Dodd's career and restricted his games tally to only 57, although he did represent Victoria in interstate football a number of times.

Notes

External links 		
		
		
		
		
		
		
Living people		
1937 births		
		
Australian rules footballers from Victoria (Australia)		
St Kilda Football Club players
East Ballarat Football Club players